The Domestic Cannabis Eradication/Suppression Program is a Drug Enforcement Administration-funded program to eradicate cannabis in the United States. DEA began the program in 1979 during the War on Drugs. In the first few years of the Reagan administration, the program expanded from seven states to forty. By 1985 it was active in all fifty states.

Results of the program vary by locality. In 2015, agents pulled 2.6 million cannabis plants in California, 27 in New Hampshire, and zero in Utah.

As of 2018, the program continues alongside various degrees of legalization or decriminalization in all but three U.S. states.

See also 
Campaign Against Marijuana Planting
Florida's Domestic Marijuana Eradication Program
Kentucky Marijuana Strike Force
Tennessee Governor's Task Force on Marijuana Eradication

References

Sources

External links

1979 establishments in the United States
Cannabis in the United States
Anti-cannabis operations
Cannabis eradication
Drug Enforcement Administration